The Commission municipale du Québec (English: Quebec Municipal Commission) is a quasi-judicial body that oversees municipal matters in the Canadian province of Quebec. The commission was founded in 1932 by the government of Louis-Alexandre Taschereau.

The commission administers municipalities that have been placed under trusteeship. In 2013, the commission temporarily oversaw municipal affairs in Laval, Quebec's third-largest municipality, when its government was implicated in a corruption scandal.

References

External links
Commission municipale du Québec (in French)

Quebec government departments and agencies